Mat-grass or mat grass may refer to the following plant species:

 Nardus stricta, native to the Northern Hemisphere
 Axonopus fissifolius, native to the Americas, introduced elsewhere
 Phyla canescens, native to South America, introduced elsewhere